Héctor Javier Hernández Genis (born 22 December 1958) is a Mexican politician affiliated with the National Action Party. As of 2014 he served as Senator of the LIX Legislature of the Mexican Congress representing Morelos as replacement of Marco Antonio Adame.

References

1958 births
Living people
People from Cuernavaca
Members of the Senate of the Republic (Mexico)
National Action Party (Mexico) politicians
Politicians from Morelos
Universidad Autónoma del Estado de Morelos alumni
21st-century Mexican politicians